Lobocleta peralbata is a moth in the family Geometridae. It is found in North America, where it has been recorded from Arizona to Florida, north to North Carolina.

The wingspan is 11–20 mm. The forewings are white with brown speckling. The antemedial, median, and postmedial lines are dark yellow and there is a dark discal dot between the antemedial and median lines. The hindwings are similar in colour and markings but lack an antemedial line. There is a dark dashed terminal line on both wings. Adults are on wing from December to September.

References

Moths described in 1873
Sterrhini